This was the first edition of the tournament.

Brian Baker and Sam Groth won the title after defeating Matt Reid and John-Patrick Smith 6–2, 4–6, [10–2] in the final.

Seeds

Draw

References
 Main Draw
 Qualifying Draw

Stockton ATP Challenger - Doubles